Beaver Creek Wilderness is a  wilderness area located in the U.S. state of Kentucky.  It was designated wilderness in 1975 and is managed by the Stearns Ranger District of the Daniel Boone National Forest.  Located beneath the clifflines of the Beaver Creek Drainage, Beaver Creek Wilderness is almost entirely enclosed by sandstone cliffs.  Below these high walls are natural arches and rock shelters used by Native Americans and early settlers.

Wildlife
Many species of wildlife can be found in Beaver Creek Wilderness, including wild turkeys, white-tailed deer, ruffed grouse, red and gray foxes, rabbits, muskrats, mink, raccoons, and its namesake beavers.  Eastern black bear populations also flourish within the wilderness and surrounding forest.

See also
List of U.S. Wilderness Areas
Wilderness Act
Clifty Wilderness

References

External links
Beaver Creek Wilderness - Daniel Boone National Forest
Beaver Creek Wilderness - Wilderness.net
Beaver Creek Wilderness - GORP
KYwilderness.com

Wilderness areas of Kentucky
IUCN Category Ib
Protected areas of McCreary County, Kentucky
Daniel Boone National Forest
1975 establishments in Kentucky
Protected areas established in 1975